Donald P. Bielke (born May 10, 1932) is a retired American basketball player.

He played collegiately for the Valparaiso Crusaders.

He was selected by the Fort Wayne Pistons in the 8th round (67th pick overall) of the 1954 NBA draft.

He played for the Fort Wayne Pistons (1955–56) in the NBA for 7 games.

After his NBA playing days, Bielke went on to coach basketball at California Concordia College for 16 years, and at California Lutheran University for another ten, winning over 550 games in his collegiate coaching career. He also was a professor in the kinesiology department.

Bielke was a coach and instructor at California Lutheran University for over ten years. As the head coach of the college basketball team, the winning years 1977–78 (18–17) and 1979–80 (14–3) are attributed to him. He spent over 27 years in the university's Athletic Department and was an adjunct professor and acting department chair of kinesiology. He coached for a total of 26 years and received the "Coach of the Year" awards on numerous occasions. He received the Leadership Award for the NAIA District III in 1990. Besides All-American honours and playing in the NBA, he also served as a board member with the YMCA, on the advisory board of the Boy Scouts, president of the Kiwanis Club, grand marshall of the Conejo Valley Days, and a Special Olympics coordinator. He received a bachelor's degree from Valparaiso University and a master's from San Francisco University.

References

External links

 Don Belke To Be Inducted Into Valpo HOF

1932 births
Living people
American men's basketball players
Basketball coaches from Minnesota
Basketball players from Minnesota
Cal Lutheran Kingsmen basketball coaches
Centers (basketball)
College men's basketball head coaches in the United States
Fort Wayne Pistons players
Fort Wayne Pistons draft picks
Valparaiso Beacons men's basketball players